The Mount Oku hylomyscus (Hylomyscus grandis) is a species of rodent in the family Muridae. Found only on Mount Oku, Cameroon, in tropical Central Africa, its natural habitat is tropical moist montane forests. It has a very small range and is threatened by habitat destruction, so the International Union for Conservation of Nature has rated its conservation status as being "critically endangered".

Description
The underparts are greyish-white, the individual hairs being grey with white tips. There is a sharp delineation between the colour of the upper and underparts. The fore-feet are small with five digits, one without a claw,  and sparse white hairs; the hind-feet are also small, have five digits with claws, and bear sparse white hairs. The tail is about 145% of the length of head-and-body and is nearly hairless, with scattered small scales and short dark bristles, longer near the tip of the tail.

Ecology
Very little is known about the ecology and behaviour of the Mount Oku hylomyscus as only four individuals have been collected. It lives in montane forest and the length of its tail makes it likely that it has a climbing life-style. One individual, caught in January, was a pregnant female with five or six embryos.

Status
Because of these factors, the International Union for Conservation of Nature has rated its conservation status as being "endangered".

References

Endemic fauna of Cameroon
Hylomyscus
Rodents of Africa
Mammals of Cameroon
Mammals described in 1969
Critically endangered fauna of Africa
Taxonomy articles created by Polbot
Fauna of the Cameroonian Highlands forests